Ante Đugum (born June 20, 1988) is a Croatian professional basketball player playing for Ribola Kaštela in the Croatian League. He is 2.11 m high and plays the Center position.

Đugum, a native of Vrgorac, played in the Zadar junior team and as a promising young player made his debut for the senior team in the 2006-07 season. He did not manage to establish himself in Zadar's senior team and did not spend much time on court in his first professional season. The next season, he spent on loan in Borik Puntamika. In the summer of 2008 he signed a contract with Cedevita Zagreb but never played for the team. The contract was canceled after only a few weeks. In the autumn of 2008, now as a free player, Đugum returns to Borik Puntamika. The 2009-10 season and part of the 2010-11 he spent in the Austrian League playing for the Kapfenberg Bulls. Part of the 2010-11 season he played for Brotnjo in the Bosnian League. In 2011 he moves to the Slovenian League. In Zlatorog Laško, for the first time in his professional career, Đugum spent a considerable amount of time on court and played a major role in his team's performances. The 2011-12 season he spent in Geoplin Slovan. In the summer of 2013 he signed a three-year contract with Zadar. In September 2014 he moved to KK Split. After two seasons in Split, he moved to Široki of the Bosnian League. In July 2017 he moved back to the Croatian League joining Ribola Kaštela.

Đugum played for the Croatian national team youth selections. He played at the 2004 European U-16 Championship, the 2006 European U-18 Championship and the 2008 European U-20 Championship.

References

External links
 Profile at FIBA Europe
 Profile at eurobasket.com
 Profile at abaliga.com

1988 births
Living people
ABA League players
Croatian men's basketball players
Kapfenberg Bulls players
KK Zadar players
KK Split players
People from Vrgorac
HKK Široki players
KK Kaštela players
Centers (basketball)
KK Borik Puntamika players